Dagur Dan Þórhallsson (born 2 May 2000) is an Icelandic footballer who plays as a midfielder for Orlando City of Major League Soccer and the Iceland national team.

Club career
Born in Hafnarfjörður, Dagur Dan spent time in the Fylkir youth ranks before joining the Haukar academy in 2013. He made his senior debut with Haukar on 12 September 2016, starting and playing the full 90 minutes of a 1–1 draw with HK in the 2016 1. deild karla. He made six appearances for the club before leaving to join the youth ranks of Belgian Pro League club Gent. He returned to Icelandic football with Keflavík in 2018, playing in the Úrvalsdeild. In the first half of 2019 he was loaned to Mjøndalen in Norway's top flight, making one league appearance and a further four in the cup before joining Mjøndalen permanently in the summer. He was immediately loaned out for the remainder of the 2019 season to third tier team Kvik Halden where he played regularly, scoring five goals in 12 league appearances as the team reached the promotion playoffs. In 2021, Dagur Dan returned to Iceland on loan from Mjøndalen, joining Fylkir for the 2021 Úrvalsdeild season. Ahead of the 2022 season he made a permanent transfer to Breiðablik.

In January 2023, Dagur signed a two-year contract with two additional club option years with Orlando City of Major League Soccer.

International career

Youth
Dagur Dan has been capped for Iceland at all age-specific levels from under-16 to under-21. He appeared in 2017 UEFA European Under-17 Championship qualification and 2019 UEFA European Under-19 Championship qualification as Iceland failed to progress from the first qualifying stage both times. He made six appearances during 2023 UEFA European Under-21 Championship qualification as Iceland reached the play-off round. He started both playoff games as Iceland lost 2–1 on aggregate to Czech Republic.

Senior
Dagur Dan received his first senior international call-up for Iceland in November 2022 for a pair of friendlies against Saudi Arabia and South Korea. Played outside of a FIFA window, the squad was a chance for manager Arnar Viðarsson to work with domestic players and those from other leagues not active in November. He made his debut on 6 November 2022, starting and playing the full 90 minutes in a 1–0 defeat to Saudi Arabia in Abu Dhabi. After missing the 2022 Baltic Cup, he returned to the squad in January 2023 for friendlies against Estonia and Sweden, starting both.

Personal life
Dagur Dan is the son of former international footballer Þórhallur Dan Jóhannsson.

Career statistics

Club

International

References

2000 births
Living people
Dagur Dan Thorhallsson
Association football midfielders
Dagur Dan Thorhallsson
Dagur Dan Thorhallsson
Dagur Dan Thorhallsson
Mjøndalen IF players
Kvik Halden FK players
Orlando City SC players
Dagur Dan Thorhallsson
Eliteserien players
Dagur Dan Thorhallsson
Expatriate footballers in Belgium
Dagur Dan Thorhallsson
Expatriate footballers in Norway
Expatriate soccer players in the United States
Dagur Dan Thorhallsson
Dagur Dan Thorhallsson
Dagur Dan Thorhallsson
Dagur Dan Thorhallsson
Major League Soccer players